The 1994 Kazakhstan Top Division was the third season of the Top Division, now called the Kazakhstan Premier League, the highest football league competition in Kazakhstan.

Teams
With the relegation of eight teams the previous season, the withdrawal of FC Dostyk before the start of the season, and no promoted teams, the league was reduced to 16 teams with them play each other twice.

The relegated teams at the end of the 1993 season were Dinamo Almaty, Azhar Kokshetau, Munaishy, Kaisar, Metallist, Namys Almaty, Karachaganak and Taldykorgan. Tselinnik Tselinograd were renamed Tsesna Akmola and Fosfor were renamed FC Taraz before the start of the season.

Team overview

League table

Results

Statistics

Top scorers

See also
Kazakhstan national football team 1994

References

External links
 Lyakhov.kz 1994 Season

Kazakhstan Premier League seasons
1994 in Kazakhstani football
Kazakh
Kazakh